Pyotr Filippovich Yakubovich (November 3, 1860 – March 30, 1911) was a Russian revolutionary, poet and member of Narodnaya Volya (People's Will Party) during the 1880s. He graduated from the Faculty of History and Philology of Petersburg University (1882). After graduating, he entered the Petersburg Department of Narodnaya Volya. He was an organizer of the "Young People's Will Party" as well as its leader and ideologist.

From the age of 24, he spent many years of his life in prisons and katorga. He spent three years in the Peter-Paul Fortress for participation in political movements and was subjected to penal servitude in Siberia from 1887 to 1899.

He published in 1895 — under the pseudonym L. Melshin — a series of essays life for the prisoners in Siberia: V Mire Otverzjennych (In the World of the Outcasts), and Pasynki zhizni (Life's Stepchildren).

According to an article on Leon Trotsky by David North (referring to Yakubovich's poems) "His poems, which evoked the heroism and tragedy of the doomed struggle of the revolutionary terrorists against tsarism, made a deep moral impact upon the youth of the 1890s."

For a list of some of his other works, see "The Lied and Art Song Texts Page" on him.

References

External links
St Petersburg Encyclopaedia entry on Pyotr Yakubovich

1860 births
1911 deaths
People from Bologovsky District
People from Valdaysky Uyezd
Russian nobility
Narodnaya Volya
Russian revolutionaries
Prisoners of the Peter and Paul Fortress